Pedro Henrique Naressi Machado (born 10 January 1998), sometimes known as  Pedrinho, is a Brazilian footballer who plays as a defensive midfielder for Ludogorets Razgrad.

Club career
Naressi came through the youth ranks at Red Bull Brasil and was a part of the squad which played in 2019 Campeonato Paulista He became part of the Red Bull Bragantino squad when Red Bull Brasil merged with Clube Atlético Bragantino in April 2019.

Naressi made his national league debut in the first game of the 2019 Campeonato Brasileiro Série B season against Brasil de Pelotas on 26 April 2019.

On 2 September 2022, he signed with Bulgarian First League club Ludogorets Razgrad. His team fought point by point for the season title.

Honours
Red Bull Bragantino
Campeonato Brasileiro Série B: 2019

References

External links
 
 

1998 births
Living people
Brazilian footballers
Association football midfielders
Campeonato Brasileiro Série A players
Campeonato Brasileiro Série B players
First Professional Football League (Bulgaria) players
Red Bull Brasil players
Clube Atlético Joseense players
Red Bull Bragantino players
Ceará Sporting Club players
Sport Club do Recife players
Brazilian expatriate footballers
Expatriate footballers in Bulgaria
People from São José dos Campos
Footballers from São Paulo (state)